Several major cities and regional business centers in the continental United States lack Amtrak or some form of inter-city passenger rail service. Six of these metropolitan areas contain more than one million residents. Other than the service provided by the Alaska Railroad, there is no U.S.-based interstate passenger rail service outside of 46 of the contiguous states and the Canadian provinces of British Columbia, Ontario, and Quebec; there is no inter-city passenger rail service to the states of South Dakota or Wyoming.

Cities lacking inter-city rail service
For purposes of this list, a city is considered served if it is within  of an Amtrak or other inter-city passenger rail station. However, some of these cities may be served directly by Amtrak Thruway services. Unless otherwise noted, the provider of the last passenger service is noted in each of the following cities was Amtrak. A partial list of the cities with a greater metropolitan population of over 100,000 that are not served by some form of inter-city rail service is as follows (in order by decreasing population):

Cities with nearby services
In addition, the following cities are not directly served by inter-city rail service, but have a rail station within 35 miles of the city.

Other gaps
Other cities are not served directly due to inconvenient water barriers:
San Francisco Peninsula – The San Francisco Bay separates the peninsula from the rest of the national rail network. Passenger service ended in 1971, when the Del Monte was discontinued and the Coast Daylight was rerouted to Oakland with the formation of Amtrak. That service was later rerouted to continue north to Portland and renamed the Coast Starlight. Caltrain connects the length of the bay shore to Amtrak at San Jose. However, since the late 1990s, Amtrak has worked on plans to resume the Coast Daylight from San Francisco to Los Angeles. Restoration of the Coast Daylight is also supported by the American Jobs Plan.
San Francisco, California - Trains stop across San Francisco Bay in Oakland and Emeryville. Whereas trains once went from Oakland to San Francisco, they had been replaced by auto traffic by the 1950s. Proposals to add a San Francisco stop to the San Jose-Sacramento Capitol Corridor are also being seriously considered.
Daly City, California - Bypassed after completion of the Bayshore Cutoff in 1907. BART tracks were eventually laid in the former rail right of way, but the city has never been reconnected to the national network.
San Mateo, California - nearest connection to the northeast in Hayward, California.
St. Petersburg, Florida - trains stop across Tampa Bay in Tampa. Trains had previously crossed the bay into St. Petersburg. The city lost direct service across the bay when CSX lacked adequate funds to maintain the bridge across the bay. There is Amtrak Thruway bus service at 110th Avenue north of City Limits off US19 to Tampa Union Station (PSTA local bus route 34 passes near this location).  Otherwise the only other method of transportation is taxi. The TECO Line Streetcar and HART buses both do not connect with the two areas, although express bus service exists between PSTA and HART.

Amtrak provides no service to Mexico. From 1973 to 1981 Amtrak operated the Inter-American, which allowed for transfers between Laredo, Texas and Nuevo Laredo, Tamaulipas for connecting service with the Ferrocarriles Nacionales de México. The closest Amtrak service to Mexico may be found at stations along the western portion of the Sunset Limited and southwestern portion of the Texas Eagle in Texas, New Mexico, Arizona, and California; as well as the Pacific Surfliner service to Union Station in San Diego.

Phoenix, Arizona is served via Amtrak Thruway motorcoach service from the Southwest Chief at Flagstaff, Arizona. In addition, as of 2017, there is Amtrak Thruway motorcoach service between Phoenix and Maricopa, Arizona, a town about 30  miles (48km) south of Phoenix, to connect with the Sunset Limited, where the train makes stops three times a week. Phoenix lost direct service in June 1996 after Southern Pacific (now part of the Union Pacific) threatened to abandon the line from Yuma.

Amtrak has studied rail lines formerly canceled that could renew service to some cities. Cities involved include Boise, Mobile, Tallahassee, the Quad Cities (four adjoining cities in northwest Illinois and southeastern Iowa), Billings, and Wichita. Proposals for high-speed rail could also restore service for several cities. Other services Amtrak could restore include the Pioneer (serving Chicago-Denver-Seattle via the California Zephyr), the Black Hawk (Chicago-Dubuque, eastern Iowa), the North Coast Hiawatha (serving Chicago-Fargo-Seattle via the Montana Rail Link), the Montrealer (Extension of the Vermonter from St. Albans, VT to Montreal, QC), and the New Orleans-Orlando segment of the Sunset Limited.

See also
 List of Amtrak routes
 List of Amtrak stations
 List of busiest Amtrak stations

References

Further reading

External links
Article on the missing markets that America's rail service doesn't serve (analysis and charts)
Chart showing U.S. population centers and Amtrak service

Amtrak
Passenger rail transportation in the United States
United States railway-related lists